69th Street station may refer to:

69 Street station (Calgary), a light rail station in Calgary, Alberta
69th Street station (IRT Flushing Line), a subway station in New York City
69th Street station (NJ Transit), in North Bergen, New Jersey
69th station, Chicago, Illinois
69th Street Transportation Center, an intermodal transit station near Philadelphia, Pennsylvania